Three-time defending champion Suzanne Lenglen defeated Molla Mallory in the final, 6–2, 6–0 to win the ladies' singles tennis title at the 1922 Wimbledon Championships. The final lasted only 23 minutes, the quickest singles final match in the history of the tournament.

Draw

Finals

Top half

Section 1

Section 2

Bottom half

Section 3

Section 4

References

External links

Women's Singles
Wimbledon Championship by year – Women's singles
Wimbledon Championships - singles
Wimbledon Championships - singles